The Tartar Steppe, also published as The Stronghold (La fortezza), is a novel by Italian author Dino Buzzati, published in 1940.
The novel tells the story of a young officer, Giovanni Drogo, and his life spent guarding the Bastiani Fortress, an old, unmaintained border fortress. The work was influenced by the 1904 poem "Waiting for the Barbarians" by Constantine P. Cavafy.

Stuart C. Hood translated the novel into English. The novel was ranked 29th on Le Monde 100 Books of the Century list.

Plot
The plot of the novel is Drogo's lifelong wait for a great war in which his life and the existence of the fort can prove its usefulness. The human need for giving life meaning and the soldier's desire for glory are themes in the novel. Drogo is posted to the remote outpost overlooking a desolate Tartar desert; he spends his career waiting for the barbarian horde rumored to live beyond the desert. Without noticing, Drogo finds that in his watch over the fort he has let years and decades pass and that, while his old friends in the city have had children, married, and lived full lives, he has come away with nothing except solidarity with his fellow soldiers in their long, patient vigil. When  the attack by the Tartars finally arrives, Drogo gets ill and the new chieftain of the fortress dismisses him. Drogo, on his way back home, dies lonely in an inn.

Adaptation
In 1976 the novel was adapted into an homonymous film (known in English as The Desert of the Tartars) by Italian director Valerio Zurlini and starring Jacques Perrin as Drogo with Max von Sydow as Ortiz and  Vittorio Gassman as Filimore. The film omits certain parts of the novel, especially those relating to the lives of Drogo's friends in his home town.

Legacy
The novel was a major influence on South African-born writer J. M. Coetzee's 1980 novel Waiting for the Barbarians, the title of which is borrowed from Constantine P. Cavafy's poem of the same name.

The novel is described as the favorite book of the author of The Black Swan, Nassim Nicholas Taleb. Taleb uses the protagonist of The Tartar Steppe to describe our human nature to anchor.

Quebec author Gilles Archambault, in Une démarche de chat: Notes sur une façon de vivre, says that this novel was a major influence on him. 

Other writers who have spoken of their indebtedness to the novel include Yann Martel, Alberto Manguel, and Tim Parks, who wrote the introduction to the 2000 Penguin edition.

This book was influential in developing and promoting the literary style known as magic realism.

See also 
Le Monde 100 Books of the Century

References

1940 novels
20th-century Italian novels
Italian novels adapted into films
Novels by Dino Buzzati
Works set in castles